Toler may refer to:

People
Notable people with the surname include:
 Burl Toler (1928-2009), American football official
 Dan Toler (1948–2013), American guitarist
 E. M. Toler (1874–1954), American physician, coroner, and state senator
 Greg Toler (born 1985), American football player
 Lynn Toler (born 1959), American judge and television personality
 Penny Toler (born 1966), American basketball player
Quashawn Toler (born 1992), American boxer
 Sidney Toler (1874–1947), actor and writer
 William Pinkney Toler (1826–1899), American artist

Places
Toler, Kentucky